The Private Life of Samuel Pepys is a 2003 British comedy television film directed by Oliver Parker and starring Steve Coogan, Lou Doillon and Nathaniel Parker. It portrays the historical diarist Samuel Pepys. It was aired on BBC Two on 16 December 2003, drawing an audience of 2.9 million viewers.

Cast
 Steve Coogan as Samuel Pepys 
 Lou Doillon as Elizabeth Pepys 
 Andrew Harrison as Clerk of the Court 
 Alex Hassell as Balty 
 Andy Linden as John Jones 
 Ciarán McMenamin as Will Hewer 
 Guy Moore as Captain John Scott 
 Simon Munnery as Mad Solomon 
 Leon Ockenden as Pembleton 
 Nathaniel Parker as Charles II 
 Tim Pigott-Smith as Lord Shaftesbury 
 Miranda Raison as Deb Willet 
 Sally Rogers as Betty Bagwell 
 Zoë Tapper as Jane 
 Danny Webb as Edward Montagu

References

External links

British television films
2003 television films
2003 films
BBC Television shows
2000s English-language films